Deep River is a river that flows  northeastly to the Little Calumet River in Lake County in northern Indiana in the United States. It is part of a fluvial system that drains about 10% of northern Indiana to Lake Michigan at Port of Indiana-Burns Harbor.

History
In the summer of 1834, the first Lake County settler and homesteader, William Ross, settled near the confluence of Turkey Creek with Deep River. Two years later in 1836, land was purchased from the Potawatomi at the confluence of Deep River with the Little Calumet River, and the town of Liverpool was platted, and later purchased by George Earle. Next, Earle moved two miles southeast and platted Hobart in 1848. Liverpool was briefly the county seat, soon displaced by Crown Point. John Wood laid a mill claim in 1835 which he expanded in 1837 to a saw-mill and a grist mill. This site was originally called Woodvale, but is now known as Deep River, Indiana, and is now the site of the Deep River County Park, where the original grist mill has been rebuilt. The local vintage Baseball team are known as "the Grinders".

Watershed
The Deep River sources at the confluence of Main Beaver Dam Ditch and Smith Ditch near Interstate 65 on the east side of Crown Point and flows east and northeast to man-made Lake George in Hobart, formed by a dam initially constructed in 1840 by George Earle. It meanders north and northeast to join the Little Calumet River  (LCR) ½ mile east of Interstate 65 and just north of Interstate 80/94 in Lake Station. From this confluence, the LCR flows east in a man-made channel known as   “Burns  Ditch”, a  channelized  section  of  the  LCR  that  connects  with the East Arm Little Calumet River and then exits north to  Lake Michigan via a man-made outlet known as Port of Indiana-Burns Harbor in Portage, Indiana.

Deep River's main tributaries are Deep Creek, Turkey Creek, and Duck Creek.

Ecology
Adjacent wetlands are found on over 10% of the Deep River watershed. Save the Dunes has been awarded funding from the Chi-Cal Rivers Fund to restore 18 acres of farmland to marshland in Hobart Marsh, adjacent to Lake George and Deep River. When completed in 2018 it will be donated to the Indiana Dunes National Lakeshore. Riparian trees of Deep River reflect typical bottomland species of elm, ash and maple. Other species associated are sycamore, box elder, river birch, and willow.

Burns Waterway is designated by the DNR as a salmonid (trout and salmon) stream.  These fish are known to migrate up Deep River as far as the Lake George dam.

Recreation
Deep River is quite muddy and moves very slowly, usually less than one mile per hour. Some of the river is choked with a series of log jams making navigation difficult. Best canoeing levels occur in the spring. Summer may make water levels too low for canoeing.

Gallery

See also
 Liverpool, Indiana
 Little Calumet River

References

External links
 Deep River County Park Wood's Historic Grist Mill area in Hobart 
 Deep River County Park Indiana Dune website
 Save the Dunes

Rivers of Lake County, Indiana
Rivers of Indiana